Ita Ford, M.M. (April 23, 1940 – December 2, 1980) was an American Catholic Maryknoll Sister who served as a missionary in Bolivia, Chile and El Salvador. She worked with the poor and war refugees. On December 2, 1980, she was beaten, raped, and murdered along with three fellow missionaries —  Dorothy Kazel, Maura Clarke and Jean Donovan —  by members of the military of El Salvador.

Life and work
Born in Brooklyn, 
New York, on April 23, 1940, Ford was the daughter of William Patrick Ford, an insurance man who took early retirement due to tuberculosis, and Mildred Teresa O'Beirne Ford, a public-school teacher.  She had an older brother, William P. Ford (1936–2008) and a younger sister, Irene. The family lived in Brooklyn. William Patrick Ford was related to Austin B. Ford, whose son, Francis Xavier Ford (1892–1952), was the first seminarian to apply to the newly established Maryknoll Fathers in 1911 and, after being ordained as a missionary in 1917, went to China, where he became a bishop and a martyr.  He died in a Communist prison camp there in 1952, when his young "cousin" Ita was twelve.

Although her mother taught in the public school system, Ita Ford was educated in parochial schools, beginning at age five in the Visitation Academy in Bay Ridge, run by the Visitation Sisters, a semi-cloistered order.  She attended Fontbonne Hall Academy, a high school operated by the Sisters of St. Joseph, where she worked on the school newspaper.  Finally, from 1957 to 1961, she attended Marymount Manhattan College, founded by the Religious of the Sacred Heart of Mary. (Marymount Manhattan split from its mother school, Marymount College, in 1961). Following in her relative the Bishop's footsteps, Ford had confided in a high school friend at the age of fifteen that she not only wanted to be a nun, she specifically felt called to be a Maryknoll missionary sister.  Even before her college graduation in 1966, Ford had a vocational counselor advising her about her fitness for Maryknoll.  She entered the Maryknoll Sisters of St. Dominic at the age of twenty-one. Three years later, due to ill health, she had to leave the formation program.

After working seven years as an editor at a publishing company, Ford reapplied and was again accepted by the Maryknoll Sisters in 1971.  After serving briefly in Bolivia in 1972, she moved to Chile a short time before the military coup there on September 11, 1973. Ford lived in a poor shantytown with Sister Carla Piette, M.M., in Santiago, where they ministered to the needs of the people, especially those who lived in poverty.

After spending a required "reflection year" in the United States, 1978–1979, before taking permanent religious vows in March 1980, Ford moved with Piette from Chile to El Salvador, arriving the day of Óscar Romero's funeral.  In June of that year, they began working with the Emergency Refugee Committee in Chalatenango. In this mission, Ford worked with the poor and war victims, providing food, shelter, transportation and burial.

After the death of Sister Carla in a flash flood on August 23, 1980—a flood which nearly cost Ford her own life, saved only by Piette's help in pushing her from the overwhelmed vehicle—Ford was joined on the mission by Maura Clarke, a Maryknoll sister who was already in El Salvador in contemplation of a mission assignment.  Altogether, Piette and Ford had worked together in Chile and El Salvador for seven years, until their deaths barely three months apart on December 2, 1980.

Murder

References

Further reading
 Hearts on Fire: The Story of the Maryknoll Sisters, Penny Lernoux, et al., Orbis Books, 1995.
 Ita Ford: Missionary Martyr, Phyllis Zagano, Paulist Press, 1996.
 The Same Fate As the Poor, Judith M. Noone, Orbis Books, 1995.
 Witness of Hope: The Persecution of Christians in Latin America, Martin Lange and Reinhold Iblacker, Orbis Books, 1981.
 "Here I Am Lord":The Letters and Writings of Ita Ford, Jeanne Evans, Orbis Books, 2005.

External links
A Search for Justice a documentary from Retro Report 
 Ford v. Garcia Trial Background. Legal history section of PBS website on "Justice and the Generals" presentation in 2002.  Accessed October 7, 2005.
 The Maura Clarke – Ita Ford Center of Brooklyn, New York.
 Martyrdom in El Salvador  Maryknoll Sisters website. Accessed October 7, 2005.
 Plant a Tree in Ita Ford's Memory Memorial program in El Salvador in honor of the four churchwomen; accessed December 9, 2006.
 Report of the Commission on the Truth for El Salvador (1993) accessed online December 9, 2006.

1940 births
1980 deaths
People from Brooklyn
Marymount Manhattan College alumni
Maryknoll Sisters
20th-century American Roman Catholic nuns
Assassinated American activists
Catholic martyrs of El Salvador
Roman Catholic missionaries in Bolivia
Roman Catholic missionaries in Chile
Roman Catholic missionaries in El Salvador
Deaths by firearm in El Salvador
Female Roman Catholic missionaries
American people murdered abroad
People murdered in El Salvador
Roman Catholic activists
American Roman Catholic missionaries
People of the Salvadoran Civil War
Burials in El Salvador
1980 murders of U.S. missionaries in El Salvador
American expatriates in Bolivia
American expatriates in Chile
American expatriates in El Salvador
Activists from New York (state)
Catholics from New York (state)
Violence against women in El Salvador